Carla Campbell (born 22 November 1980 in Jamaica) is a fashion model represented by IMG in New York. She received her most widespread exposure appearing in the 2006 Sports Illustrated Swimsuit Issue.

Information
Campbell is the first lady from the Caribbean to  appear in the popular Sports Illustrated Swimsuit Issue in 2006. She is also the second lady from the Caribbean to be featured in Victoria's Secret. She has the rare characteristic of having relatively large, natural breasts along with a toned and athletic body. Campbell is also has a modeling contract with Pulse Fashion and is a part of the Beauty Hall of Fame in Jamaica.

Clients
Campbell's clients include L'Oréal, Nike, Avon, Seventeen magazine, Footlocker, Miller Beer, Maxim, Target and Fubu.

References

External links

2006 Sports Illustrated Swimsuit Photo Gallery

1981 births
Living people
Jamaican female models